The Church of Scotland, the national church of Scotland, divides the country into Presbyteries, which in turn are subdivided into Parishes, each served by a parish church, usually with its own minister. Unions and readjustments may however result in a parish having more than one building, or several parishes sharing a minister. There are currently 42 presbyteries in Scotland, and around 1500 parishes. In addition, the Church of Scotland has three presbyteries outwith Scotland: the Presbytery of England, the Presbytery of Europe and the Presbytery of Jerusalem. These presbyteries have "gathered congregations" rather than parishes.

What follows is a list of Church of Scotland parishes, congregations and places of worship. Use :Category:Church of Scotland for an alphabetical index of parishes with Wikipedia articles. A complete list of parishes with statistical data will be found in the Church of Scotland Yearbook (known as the Red Book). See also List of Church of Scotland synods and presbyteries.

PC stands for Parish Church. * denotes the parish church of a medieval parish (Caithness, Inverness, Orkney, Peebles, Ross, Roxburgh, Selkirk, Sutherland, Wigtown) or the successor church to one.

Statistics 

In Scotland, at least 275 churches have closed since 1 January 2000, a decline of 15.6% in 21 years.

Most populous charges 

1a sui generis parish with 3 ministers

Least populous charges

Presbytery of Aberdeen and Shetland

The two presbyteries merged on 1 June 2020. The presbytery website indicates there are 33 congregations, a figure arrived at by counting the Shetland churches as one. On Shetland, one parish is made up of a number of churches. In 2018, there were 31 churches on Shetland; a process is underway by which 20 will be closed and 11 retained.

1closed 31 December 2020

2comprises the former parishes of Burra Isle; Delting; Dunrossness; Fetlar; Lerwick & Bressay; Nesting & Lunnasting; Northmavine; Sandsting & Aithsting; Sandwick, Cunningsburgh & Quarff; Tingwall; Unst; Walls & Sandness; Whalsay & Skerries; and Yell.

Closed churches in this presbytery

Presbytery of Abernethy

Closed churches

Presbytery of Angus

1formed by the union of the parishes of Airlie, Ruthven, Kingoldrum, Glenisla, Kilry and Lintrathen

Closed churches in this presbytery

Presbytery of Annandale and Eskdale

Closed churches in this presbytery

Presbytery of Ardrossan

Closed churches in this presbytery

Presbytery of Argyll

The Presbyteries of South Argyll, Lorn & Mull, and Dunoon united in 2004.

1formed by the union of the parishes of Kilarrow, and Kildalton & Oa

2formed by the union of the parishes of Kilchoman & Portnahaven, and Kilmeny

3formed by the union of the parishes of Kilninian & Kilmore; Salen & Ulva; Tobermory; and Torosay & Kinlochspelve

Closed churches in this presbytery

Presbytery of Ayr

1To be united in 2021

Closed churches

Presbytery of Buchan

Closed churches

Presbytery of Caithness

1formed by the union of the parishes of Reay, and Strathy & Halladale

2formed by the union of the parishes of Canisbay, Dunnet, Keiss and Olrig

Closed churches

Presbytery of Clyde
The presbyteries of Greenock and Paisley united to form Greenock & Paisley in 2020; Dumbarton united with Greenock & Paisley in 2020 to form Clyde.

1includes population of the parish of the recently closed Lochwinnoch church

2to be linked with Stow Brae Kirk in 2021

3to be united with Kilmacolm St Columba's in 2021

4includes population of the parishes of the recently closed St James's and St Ninian's churches

Closed churches

Presbytery of Dumfries and Kirkcudbright

1merger of Auchencairn & Rerrick, and Buittle & Kelton

Closed churches in this presbytery

Presbytery of Dundee

Closed churches in this presbytery

Presbytery of Dunkeld and Meigle

Closed churches

Presbytery of Duns

1union of the parishes of Ayton & Burnmouth, Foulden & Mordington, and Grantshouse, Houndwood & Reston

2union of the parishes of Coldstream, Swinton, and Ladykirk & Whitsome

3to be closed 2021

4union of the parishes of Bonkyl & Preston, Duns, Edrom Allanton, and Langton & Lammermuir Kirk

Closed churches

Presbytery of Edinburgh

Closed churches 
Not exhaustive; only churches with a medieval foundation, which have articles or which closed after 2000 are listed.

Presbytery of Falkirk

Closed churches

Presbytery of Fife 
The former presbyteries of Dunfermline, Kirkcaldy and St Andrews merged in January 2021.

1union of the parishes of Elie, Kilconquhar and Colinsburgh

2union of...

3union of Abdie & Dunbog, and Newburgh

Closed churches

Presbytery of Glasgow 

1union (?) of Balornock and Barmulloch

2New parish 2020

Closed churches 
Not exhaustive; only churches with a medieval foundation, which have articles or which closed after 2000 are listed.

Presbytery of Gordon

1union of the parishes of Lumsden, Strathdon and Towie

2union of the parishes of Alford, Keig, and Tullynessle & Forbes

Closed churches

Presbytery of Hamilton

Closed churches

Presbytery of Inverness

1previously Inverness West Church; relocated to Inshes 2003

Closed churches

Presbytery of Irvine and Kilmarnock

Closed churches

Presbytery of Jedburgh

1union of the parishes of Ancrum; Crailing & Eckford; and Lilliesleaf

2union of the parishes of Bedrule, Denholm, and Minton

3union of the parishes of Roxburgh; Makerstoun & Smailholm; and Stichill, Hume & Nenthorn

4union of the parishes of Hownam, Linton, Morebattle, and Yetholm

Closed churches

Presbytery of Kincardine and Deeside

1formed by the union of the parishes of Coull, Migvie, Logie Coldstone, and Tarland

2formed by the union of the parishes of Banchory-Devenick, Cookney, and Maryculter

3formed by the union of the parishes of Benholm, Garvock, Johnshaven and St Cyrus

4formed by the union of the parishes of Torphins, Kincardine O'Neil and Lumphanan

5formed by the union of the parishes of Auchenblae, Fettercairn and Glenbervie

Closed churches

Presbytery of Lanark

1including the population of the recently suppressed Lesmahagow: Abbeygreen

Closed churches in this presbytery

Presbytery of Lewis

Closed churches

Presbytery of Lochaber

1The building was put up for sale in 2020 but the congregation intends to continue meeting in a new building.

Closed churches in this presbytery

Presbytery of Lochcarron-Skye

Closed churches

Presbytery of Lothian

Closed churches in this presbytery

Presbytery of Melrose and Peebles

Closed churches

Presbytery of Moray

Closed churches

Presbytery of Orkney
The presbytery of Orkney was split into the three presbyteries of Cairston, Kirkwall and North Isles in 1725. It is not known when they reunited.

Closed churches

Presbytery of Perth

1union of the parishes of Gask, and Fowlis Wester, Madderty & Monzie

Closed churches

Presbytery of Ross

Closed churches

Presbytery of Stirling

Closed churches

Presbytery of Sutherland
The presbyteries of Dornoch and Tongue were united at an unknown date.

1To be linked with Lairg & Rogart

Closed churches

Presbytery of Uist
The Presbytery of Long Island, covering Lewis to Barra, was severed from the Presbytery of Skye in 1724. The Presbytery of Uist was severed from the Presbytery of Lewis by the General Assembly in 1742. In recent times South Uist and Barra have moved to the Presbytery of Argyll.

Closed churches in this presbytery

Presbytery of West Lothian

Closed churches

Presbytery of Wigtown and Stranraer 
The presbyteries of Wigtown and Stranraer were united in 1963.

Closed churches in this presbytery

Outwith Scotland

Presbytery of England
Crown Court Church, London
St Columba's Church, London
Corby, St Andrew's
Corby, St Ninian's
Jersey, St Columba's
Guernsey, St Andrew's in the Grange
Newcastle, St Andrew's
Liverpool, St Andrew's (dissolved 2017)

International Presbytery

Session Clerk; Rev. John Cowie BSc B.D. (Minister of English Reformed Church, Amsterdam)

Europe 
English Reformed Church, Amsterdam (1607)
English-speaking Christian Congregation, Bochum, Germany
St Andrew's Church, Brussels (1898)
St Columba's, Budapest, Hungary
Church of Scotland, Fuengirola, Spain
St Andrew's Church, Gibraltar (1854)
The Scots Kirk, Lausanne, Switzerland (1874)
Scots Kirk, Geneva
St Andrew's Church, Lisbon (1866)
St. Andrew's Scots Church, Valletta, Malta
The Scots Kirk, Paris
English Language Congregation, Regensburg, Germany (closed?)
St Andrew's Church, Rome
The Scots International Church, Rotterdam
Church of Scotland, Turin, Italy (closed?)

North America 

 Christ Church in Warwick, Bermuda (1719)
 St Ann's, Port of Spain, Trinidad
Former: St Andrew's United Church, Toronto (1830–1925)
Former: St Andrew's Church, Toronto (1876–1925)

Asia 

 St Andrew's Scots Kirk, Colombo, Sri Lanka

Presbytery of Jerusalem
St Andrew's Church, Jerusalem (1930)
 St Andrew's Church, Tiberias, Galilee
Haifa
Jaffa

Other Church of Scotland buildings and institutions
Trinity College, Glasgow
St Mary's College, St Andrews
New College, Edinburgh
Christ's College, Aberdeen
Church of Scotland Offices, 121 George St, Edinburgh
General Assembly Hall of the Church of Scotland
St Ninian's Centre, Crieff (now closed)

See also
List of Church of Scotland synods and presbyteries
St Andrew's Garrison Church, Aldershot (affiliated garrison church)
List of Free Church of Scotland congregations

References

External links
 Map of civil parishes
 Map of Church of Scotland parishes – North
Find your local church – Church of Scotland
Presbytery list

 
 List
Parishes
 
Parishes
Parishes